(English: Grimaces and telegram) is the third studio album by the Swedish-Dutch folk singer-songwriter Cornelis Vreeswijk. It is a more jazz-oriented album.

Track listing

Music and lyrics by Cornelis Vreeswijk unless otherwise noted
 Telegram för en bombad by
 Cylinderhatten
 Jubelvisa över Fiffiga Nanette
 Telegram för Lucidor
 En visa om ett rosenblad
 Medborgarinnan Agda Gustavssons lott (duet with Ann-Louise Hanson)
 Polaren Per är kärlekskrank
 Ångbåtsblues
 Telegram för en tennsoldat
 Får jag presentera Fiffiga Nanette?
 Jag hade en gång en båt (trad. Bahamian, "Sloop John B"; Vreeswijk; duet with Ann-Louise Hanson)
 "Balladen om herr Fredrik Åkare och den söta fröken Cecilia Lind" (trad. American, "Monday Morning"; Vreeswijk)
 Telegram för min värdinna
 Telegram för fullmånen

Personnel 
 Cornelis Vreeswijk - vocals, acoustic guitar
 Jan Johansson - piano
 Rune Gustafsson - guitar
 Sture Nordin - acoustic bass
 Egil Johansen - drums
 Ann-Louise Hanson - vocals

References

Cornelis Vreeswijk albums
1965 albums
Swedish-language albums